Ulster Spring is a settlement in Jamaica. In 2009, its population was recorded as 1,376.

Notable residents
Michael Thelwell – African-American scholar

References

Populated places in Trelawny Parish